Patoka Township is one of ten townships in Gibson County, Indiana, United States. As of the 2010 census, its population was 11,864 and it contained 5,341 housing units. It is the largest township in population, accounting for roughly 30% of the county's total population.

History
Patoka Township was organized in 1813. It took its name from the Patoka River.

The Lyles Consolidated School was listed on the National Register of Historic Places in 1999.

Geography

Cities and towns
 Princeton (the county seat and largest community)

Unincorporated towns
 King's Station
 Lyles Station
(This list is based on USGS data and may include former settlements.)

Adjacent townships
 White River Township (north)
 Washington Township (northeast)
 Center Township (east)
 Union Township (south)
 Montgomery Township (southwest)

Cemeteries
The township contains seven cemeteries: Archer, Hitch, Maple Hill, Odd Fellows, Saint Josephs, Sand Hill and Warnock.

Major highways
 U.S. Route 41
 State Road 64
 State Road 65

Education
Public education in Patoka Township is administered by the North Gibson School Corporation.

Public Schools
Brumfeld Elementary School
Lowell Elementary School
Princeton Community Middle School
Princeton Community High School

Private Schools
St. Joseph Catholic School

Higher Education
 Vincennes University Workforce Development

Museums
 Lyles Station Schoolhouse Museum - Lyles Station (2 miles WNW of Princeton)

References
 U.S. Board on Geographic Names (GNIS)
 United States Census Bureau cartographic boundary files

External links
 Indiana Township Association
 United Township Association of Indiana

Townships in Gibson County, Indiana
Townships in Indiana